Advans Banque Congo S.A., commonly referred to as Advans Banque, is an independent commercial bank based in the Democratic Republic of Congo, with its headquarters located in Kinshasa.

History
Advans Banque Congo  was incorporated in July 2008 and granted a commercial banking license in May 2009 by the Central Bank of Congo.

In March 2020, Proparco lent $3 million to Advans Banque Congo.

Description
The bank has a particular focus on the provision of financial services to micro, small and medium  Congolese enterprises as its niche market. Advans Banque operates 10 branches in four Congolese cities.

Advans Banque Congo is a venture between Advans SA (formally knows as Lafayette investment), a venture capital firm registered in Luxembourg as majority shareholder with KfW Entwicklungsbank, African Development Bank, International Finance Corporation and Horus Development Finance as minority shareholders in the venture. Advans SA aims to establish microfinance financial institutions in emerging economies. Advans SA owns microfinance institutions in the Democratic Republic of the Congo, Cameroon, Ghana, Cambodia, Pakistan, Cote d'Ivoire and Tanzania.

See also

 Advans
 List of banks in Africa
 Advans Bank Tanzania
 Central Bank of Congo

References

Banks of the Democratic Republic of the Congo
Banks established in 2008
2008 establishments in the Democratic Republic of the Congo

External links
 Website of the Advans Banque Congo